Karnice  is a village in the administrative district of Gmina Żmigród, within Trzebnica County, Lower Silesian Voivodeship, in south-western Poland.

The village has a population of 170.

References

Karnice